The Doctor is a 2019 play by Robert Icke. It is a reimagining of the 1912 play Professor Bernhardi by Arthur Schnitzler.

Plot 
The play follows Professor. Ruth Wolff, the Founding Director of the Elizabeth Institute, who refuses to let a Catholic priest into the operating room where a girl is dying from a botched self-administered abortion. After a recording of the physical altercation with the priest goes viral on the internet, Ruth begins to receive severe backlash from some of the hospital staff, the girl’s father, a network of social media users, and eventually, a TV panel of social activist groups. Each of the panellists question Ruth’s intention for prohibiting the priest’s entrance, who is later revealed to be a Black man, and criticize her refusal to identify with labels. The Doctor explores themes of identity, race, privilege, religion, mental health, and sexuality. In the original production, nontraditional casting methods were employed, such as color-conscious casting, to manipulate the audience’s expectations and internal biases towards identity groups.

Production history

Almeida Theatre 
The production premiered at the Almeida Theatre on August 10, 2019. It was created and directed by Robert Icke, designed by Hildegard Bechtler, lighting was designed by Natasha Chivers and sound by Tom Gibbons. It was Icke's final production as the Associate Director of the Almeida. It is an adaptation of Viennese dramatist Arthur Schnitzler's 1912 play Professor Bernhardi. 

English actress Juliet Stevenson's performance as Dr. Ruth Wolff in The Doctor received critical praise. Stevenson won the 2019 Critics’ Circle Theatre Award for Best Actress, and was nominated for both the Laurence Olivier Award and the Evening Standard Award for Best Actress. Robert Icke won the Evening Standard Award for Best Director. Live music was provided by drummer Hannah Ledwidge to underscore the tension and pacing within each scene.

Adelaide Festival 
The play headlined the Adelaide Festival in early 2020, completing its run narrowly before the coronavirus pandemic closed theatres worldwide.

UK Tour/West End 
The Adelaide Festival cast had been contracted to play a run in the West End starting in April 2020, but this was postponed due to the coronavirus pandemic. The play toured from 5 September 2022 and will open on 29 September 2022 at the Duke of York's Theatre in London.

European transfers 
In 2021, the same creative team premiered a Dutch-language version at Internationaal Theater Amsterdam, in a translation by Aus Greidanus Jr and starring the actors of the ITA ensemble. A German-language version in a translation by Christina Schlögl opened at the Burgtheater in Vienna on 7 January 2022, bringing the play full circle to the city where its source play, Professor Bernhardi, was originally composed.

Reception 
On its premiere in London, The Doctor met with positive reviews. Michael Billington of The Guardian awarded the play five stars, and praised its handling of themes like identity politics and medical ethics. In another five-star review, Fiona Mountford of The Telegraph described it as: "thrilling series of games of theatricality and rugpulling in which nothing is quite what – or who – it seems. We are, the play says from its slickly impersonal set on a slow revolve, far more complex than a series of simplistic labels." Writing for The New York Times, Matt Wolf gave a more mixed review, saying that the play "may not quite reach the heights" of Icke's previous work, and that "[y]ou might argue that Mr. Icke takes on more themes than he can handle." Aleks Sierz praised the play's pacing, acting and dialogue, which he described as "moving as well as energizing." 

It was nominated for the Laurence Olivier Award for Best New Play, in addition to Stevenson's Best Actress nomination.

Characters and cast

Awards and nominations

References 

British plays
2019 plays
West End plays
Plays about race and ethnicity